Ruairí Óg Gaelic Athletic Club, also known as Ruairí Óg and Cushendall is a Gaelic Athletic Association club located in Cushendall, County Antrim, Northern Ireland. The club is almost exclusively concerned with the game of hurling.

The club was founded in 1906 and is named after Ruairí Óg Ó Mórdha (c. 1600 – 1655), who led the Catholic side in the Irish Rebellion of 1641.

In senior hurling Ruairí Óg compete annually in the Antrim Senior Club Hurling Championship, which they have won 14 times as of 2018. The club also competes in various other championships in all grades within Antrim.

Honours
 All-Ireland Senior Club Hurling Championship Runner-Up 2016 
 Ulster Senior Club Hurling Championship (11): 1981, 1985, 1987, 1991, 1992, 1996, 1999, 2006, 2008, 2015, 2018
 Antrim Senior Hurling Championship (14): 1981, 1985, 1987, 1991, 1992, 1993, 1996, 1999, 2005, 2006, 2008, 2014, 2015, 2018
 Antrim Intermediate Hurling Championship (1): 2004
 Antrim Junior Hurling Championship (2): 1976, 1979
 Antrim Under-21 Hurling Championship (3): 1999, 2014, 2016
 Antrim Minor Hurling Championship (8): 1963, 1993, 1997, 1998, 2005, 2006, 2010, 2013

References

External links
Ruairí Óg GAA site
Official Antrim GAA site

Gaelic games clubs in County Antrim
Hurling clubs in County Antrim